Chthonosaurus is an extinct genus of eutherocephalian therapsids from the Late Permian Kutulukskaya Formation of Russia.  The type species Chthonosaurus velocidens was named in 1955.

References 

Eutherocephalians
Therocephalia genera
Lopingian synapsids of Europe
Fossils of Russia
Fossil taxa described in 1955